Proto-Mongoloid is an outdated racial classification of human beings based on a now-disproven theory of biological race.  In anthropological theories of the 19th and 20th centuries, proto-Mongoloids were seen as the ancestors of the Mongoloid race.

Notable examples of fossils that were formerly thought to belong to the proto-Mongoloid group are found in Late Pleistocene (Upper Paleolithic) fossils, notably the Minatogawa skeletons and the Liujiang crania.

The Jōmon people of Japan, Southeast Asians, Pacific islanders, and Native Americans were thought to be most closely related to the proto-Mongoloid group.

Morphological characteristics 
While the Jōmon are relatively short, and have finely chiseled features, most times double eyelids, much body hair and often wavy hair which resemble pseudo-Caucasoid traits, the Proto-Mongoloids were often described as "straight-haired type, medium in complexion, jaw protrusion, nose-breadth, and inclining probably to round-headedness".

Professor of anthropology,  at the International Research Center for Japanese Studies, Kyoto, said that there were Neo-Mongoloids and Paleo-Mongoloids. Akazawa said Neo-Mongoloids have "extreme Mongoloid, cold-adapted features" and they included the Chinese, Buryats, Eskimo and Chukchi. In contrast, Akazawa said Paleo-Mongoloids are less cold-adapted. He said Burmese, Filipinos, Polynesians, Jōmon and the indigenous peoples of the Americas were Paleo-Mongoloid.

References

Indigenous peoples of East Asia
Peopling of East Asia
Peopling of Southeast Asia
Archaeogenetic lineages